Okunev culture, sometimes also Okunevo culture, was   south Siberian archaeological culture of pastoralists of the early Bronze Age  dated from the end of the 3rd millennium BC to the early of the 2nd millennium BC in Minusinsk Basin on the middle and upper Yenisei. It was formed from the local Neolithic Paleo-Siberian forest cultures, and later received some admixture from a, predominantly male, Late Yamnaya - Early Catacomb population from the North-Western Caspian region, which expanded eastwards to the territory of Southern Siberia.

History 
The Okunev culture was discovered by Sergei Teploukhov in 1928.  It was named after nearby Okunev settlement in southern modern Khakassia. Initially, the burials from Okunev were attributed by S. A. Teploukhov to the Andronovo culture. Then on the basis of the finds of vessels Teploukhov considered the population to be a transitional variant between Afanasevo and Andronovo culture.

In 1947, M. N. Komarova singled out the sites in the early Okunev stage of the Andronovo culture.

In 1955-1957 A.N. Lipsky  found Okunev stone slabs with images as part of stone boxes in which burials were made.  Lipsky, who was a professional ethnographer and not an archaeologist, assumed that the Okunev sites were pre-Afanasiev and attributed them to the Paleolithic era, since he considered the Okunev people to be the ancestors of the American Paleo-Indians, based on parallels in art and anthropology.

In the early 1960s G. A. Maksimenkov identified an Okunev culture based on the excavations of the Chernovaya VIII burial ground, whose burials were not disturbed by later invasions and did not contain Afanasevo ceramics.

Characteristics 

Differentiate early Uibat stage, later Chernov stage, final Razliv stage in Okunev culture.

Typical sites of Tas-Khaaz,  Beltyry, Uibat III, Uibat V (on Uybat  river  basin), Chernovaya VIII, Chernovaya  XI,  Razliv  X, Strelka.

The typological horizon between the development of the Afanas’ev and Okunev steppe cultures in the Minusinsk Basin and the development of the later Andronovo type is very thin.

Finds from the Okunev culture include works of art, which included stone statues with human faces (Tas Khyz, as well as Ulug Khurtuyakh tas) and images of birds and beasts hammered out on stone slabs or engraved on bone plaques.

There were no significant indications of property and social stratification.

Livestock, horse, and agriculture 
The  basis of  population economic activity was stock-raising and animal husbandry (cattle, sheep, and goats), supplemented by wild animals hunting and fishing.

Stone hoes, grain graters and pestles, a reaping sickle (copper blade, horn handle) testify to agriculture.

Pottery 

Though the ceramic styles of the Okunev are more comparable to later Incised Coarse Ware (ICW), formally and ambiguously Andronovo ceramics. But as the researchers note, the uniqueness of each of them is an important feature of the Okunev culture. Finds from the Okunev culture include lavishly decorated jug-like and conical  vessel.  Okunev ceramics are typically flat bottomed with notable continuous ornamentation of the body, the bottom, edge of the rim and its inner side. Most often these are jar vessels, there are also incense burners with an internal partition.

Metallurgy 
Okunevtsy had developed metallurgy based on the ores of the Sayano-Altai Mining and Metallurgy areas.  Okunevtsy and their neighboring Samus' produced the first in bronze in north-eastern Central Asia. Finds include copper and  tin (rarely arsenic) bronze articles. Simple copper objects were superseded by tin alloys. Bronzes are common in this culture. Tools  include embedded-handled knives, leaf-shaped knives, awls, fishhooks, and temporal rings. Along with forging, casting was also used, which indicates a rather high level of metalworking. Ornaments of this culture consist mainly of ring-shaped ornaments with circular cross-sections and flat joints at both ends.

Warfare 
Short sword are relatively advanced with clear boundaries between the handles and the blades. A bronze spear was found at the late Okunevo cultural site, the socket of which was forged with two loose ends. The first of this kind appeared in the Asian steppe region.

Burials 
The  Okunevo  culture  is  represented  mostly  by  mounds burial  structures, which were composed of small, rectangular surface enclosures made of stone slabs or sandstone tiles placed vertically in the ground. Within these enclosures were graves that were also lined with stone slabs.  Currently  62  Okunevo kurgans  consisting  of  more  than  500  burials  and  60  single  burials  have  been studied.

The cemeteries of the Okunev culture are located, as a rule, not far from the Afanasiev ones and number from 2 to 10 burial mounds. Sometimes there are burial complexes measuring 40 × 40 meters. The number of graves inside the fence varies - from 1 to 10 and even 20.  In addition to single burials, there are paired and collective burials. In almost every burial ground there are burials of a man with two women. The buried were laid, as in Afanasiev's time, on their backs with legs strongly bent at the knees and arms extended along the body.

Dating 
Radiocarbon AMS dating of 50 Okunevo samples are within 2600 –1800 BCE. According to these studies the Uybat period is dated as 2600 – 2300 BCE, Chernovaya as 2200 – 1900 BCE, and Razliv later than 1800 BC.

Geographic extent 
The settlements of the Okunev culture were located in the Minusinsk basin, on the middle and upper Yenisei.

In the narrow mountain valleys of Khyzyl Khaya and Khurtuy Khola, on the banks of now dry streams, on the modern territory of the Kazanovka Museum-Reserve, where petroglyphs of the Okunev period are located.

On the right bank of the Tuba River, the right tributary of the Yenisei, against the village of Tes  to the southeast of the village of Ilyinka between the logs and the Shush River to the southwest of the village of Shalabolino, Kuraginsky District, Krasnoyarsk Krai, there is the Shalabolino Petroglyphs, where the Okunev rock art monuments are also represented.

In the Idrinsky district, east of the village of Bolshoi Telek.

In the Krasnoturansky District on the left bank of the Bir River under Mount Kozlikha, on the banks of the Syda River.

In the Kuraginsky district in the village of Novopokrovka.

In the Minusinsky District, on the banks of the Tuba River, near the village of Kavkazsky, nearby the zaimka of Maidashi.

On the shore of the lake near the village of the same name Maly Kyzykul, during excavations in the Okunev layer, archaeologists in 1973 discovered the remains of a burnt log structure and fragments of ceramic dishes.

Five burials in slab boxes were excavated 1 km south of Minusinsk on the northern outskirts of a pine forest.

Related cultures 
Okunev culture shares some elements of its material culture including pottery with a number of local contemporaneous cultures from adjacent areas such as the Samus’, Elunino, Karacol, and Krotovo cultures  of  western  Siberia and Altai, the Kanay type burials of eastern Kazakhstan,  and  the Okunevo-like culture of Tuva. Nevertheless, there is currently no sound evidence of the common origins of it.

The connections between the Afanasiev and Okunev cultures are rather difficult to trace. The period of their interaction lasted only about a hundred years, in some territories coexistence is noted. Archaeologists have identified many complexes containing signs of both Okunev and Afanasevo origins. However, almost no genetic traces of Afanasevtsy in the Okunev genotype have been found, meaning Afanasiev population was displaced by the alien Okunevtsy.

The similarity between some of the objects from the Okunev burial grounds and objects found in sites in the vicinity of the middle Ob River and the Lake Baikal region indicates that the bearers of the Okunev culture came to southern Siberia from the northern taiga regions. While preceding the Afanasevo culture is considered Indo-European, the Okunev culture is generally regarded as an extension of the local non-Indo-European forest culture into the region.

The Okunev people closely interacted with  succeeded cultures of the Andronovo circle.

Settlements 
The settlements of this culture have been little studied. Mountain Fortress Sve  mountain settlements with fortifications (about 45 were found on the territory of Khakassia) are considered mainly as cult complexes. The fortress of Chebaki is one of the first archeologically studied Sve.

Settlements are known on the territory of Tuva on upper Yenisei.

Wheeled transport 
The Okunev people used two- and four-wheeled carts. In the rock art of the Minusinsk Basin, images of early (end of the 3rd millennium BC) two-wheeled carts with a composite drawbar of two poles converging at an angle, which simultaneously form the body frame, are common. The design of the wagons and the profile manner of depiction indicate a connection not with Eastern Europe, but with the western regions of Central Asia and, indirectly, with Asia Minor.

Physical Anthropology 

The anthropological type of the population was of mixed Caucasoid-Mongoloid origin, with a predominance of Mongoloid. As A. V. Gromov notes, their morphological heterogeneity was striking - there are both purely Mongoloid skulls and typically Caucasoid ones that do not reveal any traces of Mongoloid admixture. In his opinion, the appearance of the Okunev people was formed as a result of the mixing of the local Neolithic population with influx  of Afanasyevtsy from the territory of Central Asia and Kazakhstan.

According to A. G. Kozintsev, the appearance of the Okunev people varies depending on the region. The Okunev people of the Minusinsk Basin were the descendants of the local Neolithic population, which was distinguished by its significant originality against the background of the races of the first order. The Okunev people of Tuva show stronger influence from the Pits culture and early Catacomb culture of Ukraine. He argues that the main ancestry of the Okunev people can be traced back to the Ancient North Eurasians and that the anthropologic type of the Okunev people can be described as "Americanoid", noting the specific overlaps in characteristics with the Indigenous peoples of the Americas.

According to A. V. Polyakov, the culture was formed from the local Neolithic Paleo-Siberian forest cultures and later received some admixture from the Caspian Sea by a group of mostly male pastoralists of the Yamnaya culture.

While some authors have suggested that the Okunevo may have descended from more northern tribes that replaced Afanasievo cultures in this region, others believe the Okunevo culture was the result of contact between local Neolithic hunter-gatherers with western pastoralists.

Maksimentkov suggested that Okunevo culture  was developed by the local Neolithic tribes of the Krasnoyarsk - Kansk forest-steppe who lived to the north of the Minusinsk Basin.

The second theory that is supported at the present time by most researchers suggests that Okunevo culture resulted from the interaction of local Neolithic hunter-gatherers with Western cattle breeders.

Paleogenetics 

Autosomal DNA analysis found that the Okunevo people formed predominantly from a lineage closely related to Paleolithic Siberians (Ancient North Eurasian) with admixture from Neo-Siberians. The date of admixture is estimated to around 7,000 years ago. Representatives of the Okunev culture are dominated by the Y-chromosomal haplogroup Q1a (subcladeas Q1a1b1, Q1a2a1c, Q1a2b), followed by haplogroup NO(xO), presumably Haplogroup N-M231. In one representative of the Okunev culture, the subclade R1b1a2-M269 of the Y-chromosomal haplogroup R1b was identified. In the RISE664 sample (4409–4156 years ago, Okunevo_EMBA), the Y-chromosomal haplogroup Q1b1a3a1~-Y18330* was identified. The Y-chromosomal haplogroup Q1b2b1~-Y2679*  and the mitochondrial haplogroup A-a1b3*  were identified in the RISE674 sample (4300–3850 years ago, Okunevo_EMBA). In representatives of the Okunev culture from the burial ground of Syda V (Minusinsk Basin), a variety of mitochondrial DNA variants was determined. The Okunevs belonged to the West Eurasian (U, H, J and T) and East Eurasian (A, C and D) subbranches of haplogroups.

The results of the analysis of the origin of the ancient steppe populations of nomads of the Eurasian steppe (from the Urals to Altai), including representatives of the Bronze Age Okunev culture from the Sayan-Altai, showed that the samples contained components that were most pronounced in Ancient North Eurasian, Eastern hunter-gatherers, Caucasian hunter-gatherers from Georgia and also occur from the component that is most pronounced among the Nganasans (Samoyedic people) and is widely distributed among various modern people from Siberia and Central Asia. Among the earlier steppe inhabitants, the hereditary component, which is most pronounced in the populations of East Asia, occurs in trace amounts. Haplogroup N-M231, which has been introduced into Okunevo-related populations from geneflow from further East, and later spreaded as part of the Seima-Turbino phenomenon.

According to recent studies, modern Native American Indians are genetically close to representatives of the Okunev culture, which confirms previous craniometric studies. Their common ancestors probably come from the population of the Late Paleolithic from the cluster of hunter-gatherers Malta (Mal'ta Cluster)  (sites Malta in the Baikal region and Afontova Gora in Krasnoyarsk).

The Okunevo population showed high genetic affinities with the Botai culture, some of the Tarim mummies, and Altai hunter-gatherers, and may be ancestral to Uralic-speaking populations.

Art 

Representative art: small amulets, stone steles up to 4 m tall and petroglyphs.

The Okunev people left behind wonderful monuments of art.  Characteristic rock inscriptions and stone statues have become famous since the travels of D. G. Messerschmidt in 1722-1723 and subsequent Academic expeditions. Steles with drawings from burial vaults are unique. The stone slabs are dominated by realistic images of animals and masks in headdresses, which apparently had a cult character. Rock art monuments are being studied and new ones are being discovered that were not studied by previous researchers. Menhirs are common in the territory of modern Khakassia and the southern part of the Krasnoyarsk Krai. More than 300 of them have been explored on the territory of the Minusinsk Basin. Only 10 sites are known on the right bank of the Yenisei.

The impressive stone steles were originally erected at gravesites and were subsequently reused more thean millennium later in the Scythian-era kurgans of Tagar Culture.

Okunev stone stelas collection  displayed in the Khakass National Museum of Local Lore in Abakan,  Martyanov Museum in Minusinsk, Historical and architectural open-air museum of Novosibirsk and ceramics collection displayed in Hermitage Museum in Saint Petersburg.

Anthropomorphic images 

The vivid character of the art of the Okunev culture is created by monumental stone sculptures and steles  with anthropomorphic images carved on them. The statue is usually a tall stone reaching up to 6 meters in height (sandstone or granite) of a saber shape. The front is its narrow edge. More than 300 of them have been studied on the territory of the Minusinsk Basin, only 10 monuments are known on the right bank of the Yenisei river.  Many of them are displayed now in Museums. A fantastic mask looks at the viewer from it: three eyes, nostrils, a huge mouth, horns, long ears and all kinds of processes. The image moves from the front face to the wide side, and sometimes to the back. In addition to the central mask, there are often additional, smaller ones. Sometimes the statue depicts the mouth of a predator, sometimes bulls, many so-called solar symbols. They come in different styles, but usually it is a circle inscribed in a square, a kind of mandala, a symbol of the cosmos. This sign as an official symbol is placed both on the state flag and on the state emblem of modern Khakassia. It was discussed that vertical steles might be used as the ancient tool of orientation in space - time milestones and gnomons - sundial of solar hours calendars.  A graphical drawing of vertical sundial can be seen in the divergent rays on sun-faced stele, where the tooth is a benchmark for accurate determination of the noon.

Artistic features of images 
The following artistic features are distinguished:

 free scatter of figures in the pictorial field;
 the presence of anthropomorphic masks;
 elongated proportions of stylized figures;
 a variety of fantastic animals;
 anthropomorphic creatures with bird and animal heads;
 the sacred (world) mountain in the form of a triangle, divided into parts;
 triadic compositions, in which the image of a female deity or its symbol is flanked by two figures of a person or animal;
 images of deities in pointed hats and with bull horns;
 images of Janus anthropomorphic deities;
 images of anthropomorphic figures with two eagle heads;
 images of birds and ornithomorphic figures with a spiral "tuft" on their heads;
 figures of a man with legs and head turned in profile, and the body in front;
 images of characters under the arch of the "firmament";
 solar sign.

Ethnolinguistic affiliation 
The Okunev culture population may be associated with the Proto-Uralic speakers and showed genetic affinity with the earlier Botai culture and the Tarim mummies, both having high amounts of Ancient North Eurasian ancestry. The "eastern" genetic components may have been resulted from areal contact with Proto-Turkic peoples. Peyrot argues that the Okunevo culture is either to be associated with Proto-Samoyedic or Proto-Uralic, stating that "the Okunevo Culture is not to be identified with early Samoyedic, but with Proto-Uralic. This is consistent with Janhunen’s convincing arguments that the Ural-Altaic typological profile of Uralic and the primary split between Samoyedic and Finno-Ugric point to an eastern origin (2001; 2009), and it would be just in time for Finno-Ugric to split off and move west towards the Ural Mountains, where this branch was influenced by Proto-Indo-Iranian (e.g. Kuz’mina 2001)."

See also 

Chebaki Fortress Sve-Takh

References

Citations

Sources

Archaeological cultures of Siberia
Bronze Age Asia
Khakassia
Archaeological cultures in Russia
Bronze Age cultures